NMSP may refer to:
 N-Methylspiperone
 National Movement for Stability and Progress
 New Mexico State Police
 New Mon State Party